Herman Brister DeCell (1924–1986) was a lawyer and politician in Mississippi. He served in the Mississippi Senate from 1959 to 1979.

He was born in Yazoo City and lived there as an adult. He was a partner at Henry, Barbour, DeCell and Bridgforth.

He wrote and article about federal crop insurance.

He was endorsed by the Holmes County Herald in 1975. He gave an oral interview in 1997.

References

This draft is in progress as of October 18, 2022.

Mississippi politicians

1924 births
1986 deaths